George Washington Brush (October 4, 1842 – November 18, 1927) was an American soldier, dentist, physician and politician. He served as a captain of a black company in the 34th Infantry Regiment U.S. Colored Troops in the Union Army during the American Civil War and received the Medal of Honor. After the war he became first a dentist and then a physician. He was elected to the New York State Assembly and then the State Senate. As chairman of the Senate Health Committee he helped establish the State Tuberculosis Sanatorium at Saranac Lake.

Early life and education
Brush was born in West Hills, Huntington, New York in 1842. He was born in the family farmhouse that is still standing and occupied today. He left to live in Brooklyn at the age of 17. He worked in a dry goods store for $2.00 per week. Two years later when the Civil War began he was among the first to volunteer.

Career

Civil War
On August 13, 1861 George joined the 48th New York Regiment as a private and fought at the capture of Fort Walker and Fort Beauregard. On June 6, 1863 he was promoted to 2nd Lieutenant and volunteered to serve with the newly formed 34th USCT Infantry Regiment made up of black slaves from South Carolina. He was among the first group of white officers to command a unit of all black troops. By 1865 he was a captain commanding a full company of the 34th Regiment.

After the war, Brush became a Companion of the Massachusetts Commandery of the Military Order of the Loyal Legion of the United States.  He was also a Compatriot of the Empire State Society of the Sons of the American Revolution.

Medal of Honor
The 34th Infantry Regiment was ordered on May 24, 1864 on an expedition to Asheepo River, South Carolina to burn a railroad trestle across a marsh at that point. About 400 members of the black regiment were loaded onto the troop steamer Boston, including 1st Lieutenant George W. Brush and the men of his company. The men had been ferried out to the Boston by small boats and one was fastened to the ships stern. Sailing down the Asheepo River in fog and darkness the ship became stranded upon an oyster bed. The Confederates planted a battery of guns on the river bank and began shelling the Boston. Lieutenant Brush quickly assembled four volunteers and began transporting men from the Boston to shore with the one small boat available. His Medal of Honor citation reads as follows "voluntarily commanded a boat crew, which went to the rescue of a large number of Union soldiers on board the stranded steamer Boston, and with great gallantry succeeded in conveying them to shore, being exposed during the entire time to heavy fire from a Confederate battery". Instrumental in attaining the Medal of Honor for Lieutenant Brush were the efforts of the unit's Chaplain Homer W. Moore.

Dentist and physician
After the war Brush returned to Brooklyn and became a dentist. After several years as a dentist he entered Long Island College Hospital Medical School from which he graduated in 1876. He had a long and successful medical practice in Brooklyn.

State legislator
Dr. Brush was very active in Brooklyn civic and political affairs. He was a member of the New York State Assembly (Kings Co., 7th D.) in 1895; and a member of the New York State Senate (4th D.) from 1896 to 1898, sitting in the 119th, 120th and 121st New York State Legislatures. He was chairman of the Senate Health Committee and helped to establish the N.Y. State Tuberculosis Sanitarium at Saranac Lake.

He was also a member of the Sons of the American Revolution and the Military Order of the Loyal Legion of the United States.

Personal life
Brush had married Alice Bowers in Huntington in 1865 while home on leave. Alice sailed from New York to Florida to join Brush seven weeks after the wedding. The steamship was caught in a storm off Cape Hatteras and sank with all on board being lost. In 1868 Brush married Marie Bowers, Alice's younger sister. They were married for fifty-eight years and had one child, a son named Herbert.

Death
Dr. Brush died on November 16, 1927 and is buried in the Huntington Rural Cemetery in Suffolk County in Long Island, New York.

See also

List of Medal of Honor recipients

Notes

References

Beyer, W. F. and Keydel, O. F., Deeds of Valor: How America's Civil War Heroes Won the Congressional Medal of Honor, Stamford CT, Longmeadow Press, 1994.
Brush, Marie Annette Bowers, Brush-Bowers Genealogy, Brooklyn, N.Y., 1904
Mann, Conklin, Thomas and Richard Brush of Huntington, N.Y. The New York Genealogical and Biographical Society Record, Vols. LXVI and LXVII< 1935-1936.
U.S. Colored Troops Organized In South Carolina, 34th USC Infantry, Web. 12 April 2010.
http://scusct.org.
Congressional Medal of Honor recipients The Congressional Medal of Honor Society, Web. 10 April 2010.
http://www.cmohs.org.

External links

1842 births
1927 deaths
People from West Hills, New York
American people of English descent
Members of the New York State Assembly
New York (state) state senators
Union Army officers
United States Army Medal of Honor recipients
Physicians from New York (state)
People from Brooklyn
American Civil War recipients of the Medal of Honor